The prime minister of Thailand (literally 'chief minister of state') is the head of government of Thailand. The prime minister is also the chair of the Cabinet of Thailand. The post has existed since the Revolution of 1932, when the country became a constitutional monarchy. Prior to the coup d'état, the prime minister was nominated by a vote in the Thai House of Representatives by a simple majority, and is then appointed and sworn-in by the king of Thailand. The house's selection is usually based on the fact that either the prime minister is the leader of the largest political party in the lower house or the leader of the largest coalition of parties. In accordance with the 2017 Constitution, the Prime Minister can hold the office for no longer than eight years, consecutively or not. The post of Prime Minister is currently held by retired general Prayut Chan-o-cha, since the 2014 coup d'état.

History
The office of the "President of the People's Committee", later changed to "Prime Minister of Siam", was first created in the Temporary Constitution of 1932. The office was modeled after the prime minister of the United Kingdom, as Siam became a parliamentary democracy in 1932 after a bloodless revolution. However, the idea of a separate head of government in Thailand is not new.

Prior to 1932, Thailand was ruled by absolute monarchs, who acted as both the head of state and the government. However, during the middle and latter reigns of the Chakri Dynasty, several individuals were perceived to hold a post equivalent to a head of government. During the reign of King Mongkut, Somdet Chao Phraya Si Suriyawongse had a very significant role in an otherwise absolutist system. During the reign of King Chulalongkorn, Prince Damrong Rajanubhab took over this role. In fact, the office most considered the precursor of that of the prime minister was the ancient office of Samuha Nayok (สมุหนายก), which was run by an Akkhra Maha Senabodi (อัครมหาเสนาบดี) or "chief minister in charge of civilian affairs".

The first prime minister of Siam was Phraya Manopakorn Nititada, a judge. The title of the office was changed from "Prime Minister of Siam" to "Prime Minister of Thailand" in 1945 and then permanently with the renaming of Siam to Thailand in 1949. For most of its existence the office has been occupied by Army leaders; sixteen out of twenty-nine, including the incumbent general Prayut Chan-o-cha. Military dominance began with the country's second prime minister, Phot Phahonyothin, who ousted his civilian predecessor in a coup in 1933. The longest-serving prime minister was Field Marshal Plaek Pibulsonggram at 14 years, 11 months, and 18 days. The shortest was Tawee Boonyaket at just 18 days. Nine were removed by coups d'état, three were disqualified by court order, and eleven resigned from office. The youngest ever to occupy office was M.R. Seni Pramoj at 40 years old. Thailand received its first female prime minister, Yingluck Shinawatra, in 2011. Every prime minister since Manopakorn Nititada has been Buddhist.

The current 2017 Constitution states that the Prime Minister shall hold the office for no longer than eight years, consecutively or not. The term limit was the subject of legal challenge in 2022 after there were debates of how to count the term.

Appointment
The prime minister of the Kingdom of Thailand must be a member of the House of Representatives. Therefore, the qualifications for the office of prime minister are the same as the qualifications for membership in the house.

Prior to the coup d'état, to be appointed, the nominee for the office must have the support of one-fifth of the members of the House of Representatives. Then after a simple-majority vote in the house, a resolution will be passed and submitted to the king, who will then make a formal appointment by giving his royal assent to the resolution. This must take place within thirty days after the beginning of the first session of the House of Representatives after an election. If no candidate can be found within this time period, then it is the duty of the president of the National Assembly of Thailand to submit the name considered most worthy for the king to formalize.

The nominee and eventual prime minister is always the leader of the largest political party in the lower house or the leader of the majority coalition formed after an election.

Under the current junta, the nominee for the office is selected by National Legislative Assembly, with the House of Representatives being abolished.

Function
The prime minister is the de facto chair of the Cabinet of Thailand. The appointment and removal of ministers can only be made with their advice. As the leader of the government the prime minister is therefore ultimately responsible for the failings and performance of their ministers and the government as a whole. The prime minister cannot hold office for a consecutive period of more than eight years. As the most visible member of the government the prime minister represents the country abroad and is the main spokesperson for the government at home. The prime minister must, under the constitution, lead the cabinet in announcing the government's policy statement in front of a joint-session of the National Assembly, within fifteen days of being sworn-in.

The prime minister is also directly responsible for many departments. These include the National Intelligence Agency, the Bureau of the Budget, the Office of the National Security Council, the Office of the Council of State, the Office of the Civil Service Commission, the Office of the National Economic and Social Development Board, the Office of Public Sector Development Commission, and the Internal Security Operations Command. Legislatively all money bills introduced in the National Assembly must require the prime minister's approval.

The prime minister can be removed by a vote of no confidence. This process can be evoked, firstly with the vote of only one-fifth of the members of the House of Representatives for a debate on the matter. Then after the debate a vote is taken and with a simple majority the prime minister can be removed. This process cannot be repeated within one parliamentary session.

Office and residence
The prime minister is aided in his work by the Office of the Prime Minister a cabinet-level department headed usually by two ministers of state. These offices are housed in the Government House of Thailand in the Dusit area of Bangkok.

The official residence of the prime minister is the Phitsanulok Mansion, in the center of Bangkok. The mansion was built during the reign of King Vajiravudh. It became an official residence in 1979. The mansion is rumored to have many ghosts, therefore most prime ministers live in their private residences and only use the house for official business.

Deputy prime ministers

Several deputy prime ministers of Thailand can be appointed. This position can be combined with other ministerial portfolios.

Note: † Military officers

List of prime ministers

Flags of the prime minister

See also

List of prime ministers of Thailand
Constitution of Thailand
Government of Thailand
Office of the Prime Minister (Thailand)
Cabinet of Thailand

References

External links
 Official Website, website for the Royal Thai Government
 History of Thai Prime Ministers, a detailed list of Prime Ministers

 
 
1932 establishments in Siam